Katharina Landfester is a German chemist who is a professor at the Max Planck Institute for Polymer Research. Her research considers the physical properties of droplets, polymerisation in emulsion and the synthesis of nanoparticles.

Early life and education 
Landfester studied chemistry at the Technical University of Darmstadt and graduated in 1993. During her undergraduate degree she was a research intern at the École européenne de chimie, polymères et matériaux (then Ecole d’Application des Hauts Polymères). She joined the Max Planck Institute for Polymer Research as a graduate student, where she worked with Hans W. Spiess on the characterisation of polymers using solid-state nuclear magnetic resonance. She moved to the United States as a postdoctoral researcher, where she joined Lehigh University. She returned to Germany where she joined the Max Planck Institute of Colloids and Interfaces and oversaw the emulsion group.

Research and career 
Landfester joined the University of Ulm as a full Professor and Head of the Department of Organic Chemistry. Whilst at the University, she started to explore materials for biomedical applications, with a focus on better understanding the interactions of nanoparticles with cellular compartments. By 2008 she had been appointed Director of the Max Planck Institute for Polymer Research.

Landfester has studied colloids with precisely controlled physical properties. Colloids are particles suspended in a liquid, and can permit the encapsulation of therapeutic and self-healing agents as well as the creation of specific nanostructures. She is interested in the creation of protocells – vesicular structures that are generally considered the minimal units of synthetic biology – from self-assembled block copolymers. These block copolymers contain permeable nanocontainers that can act as cell-like functions.

Awards and honours 
 2001 Reimund Stadler prize
 2002 University of Potsdam Habilitation in Physical Chemistry
 2002 Member of the Junge Akademie
 2010 Elected to AcademiaNet
 2011 Elected member of Acatech

Selected publications

References 

German women chemists
German women scientists
Max Planck Institute for Polymer Research people
Lehigh University people
1969 births
Living people
Technische Universität Darmstadt alumni
Max Planck Institute directors